Ocean World can mean several things:

Ocean world, an astronomical body possessing a significant amount of water
Oceanworld Manly, a theme park
"Ocean World" is an episode of The Blue Planet
Ocean World (water park), a water park in South Korea
Ocean World, an aquarium in Crescent City, California
Ocean Worlds Exploration Program at NASA

See also
Marine World (disambiguation)
Sea World (disambiguation)
Water planet (disambiguation)
Water World (disambiguation)
World Ocean